Ib Jørgen Melchior (September 17, 1917 – March 14, 2015) was a Danish-American novelist, short-story writer, film producer, film director, and screenwriter of low-budget American science fiction movies, most of them released by American International Pictures.

Personal life
Melchior was born and raised in Copenhagen, Denmark, the  son of Lauritz Melchior, an opera singer. He served in the Counterintelligence Corps (U.S. Army) during World War II, getting his training at Camp Ritchie in Maryland which classifies him as one of the Ritchie Boys. He also participated in the liberation of Flossenbürg concentration camp as well as the discovery of stolen currency, gold and art at Merkers-Kieselbach Cavern, and the capture of a Werwolf unit in 1945, for which he was awarded the Bronze Star. He was also involved in a long legal battle involving his father's estate, Chossewitz in Brandenburg, Germany, which was confiscated by the communist government of East Germany and never returned.

In 1965, a decorated war hero, he was dubbed Knight Commander of the Militant Order of Saint Bridget of Sweden.

In 1976, the Academy of Science Fiction, Fantasy and Horror Films awarded Ib Melchior its Golden Scroll Award of Merit for Outstanding Achievement.

Biographies include Ib Melchior: Man of Imagination by Robert Skotak, as well as Melchior's own autobiography Case by Case: A U.S. Army Counterintelligence Agent in World War II.

Melchior died on March 14, 2015, at the age of 97, five months after the death of his wife of over 50 years, architect Cleo Baldon.

Fiction and non-fiction

Melchior's novels include Code Name: Grand Guignol, Eva, The Haigerloch Project, The Marcus Device, Order of Battle: Hitler's Werewolves, Sleeper Agent, The Tombstone Cipher and The Watchdogs of Abaddon.

His non-fiction includes the books Quest: Searching for Germany's Nazi Past (with co-author Frank Brandenburg) and Lauritz Melchior: The Golden Years of Bayreuth, the latter a biography of his father, the opera singer and movie star Lauritz Melchior. In 1993 Melchior published an account of his career as a staff sergeant with the US Counterintelligence Corps (U.S. Army) during World War II, Case by Case: A U.S. Army Counterintelligence Agent in World War II. With his wife, Cleo Baldon, Melchior wrote the non-fiction books Reflections on the Pool: California Designs for Swimming and Steps & Stairways, both influenced by Baldon's work as an architect.

Melchior also wrote Hour of Vengeance, a play based on the Viking story of Amled that also inspired William Shakespeare's play Hamlet. In 1982, it was awarded the Hamlet Award for best playwriting by the Shakespeare Society of America.

Films and television

As a filmmaker, Melchior wrote and directed The Angry Red Planet (1959) and The Time Travelers (1964).  His most high-profile credit was as co-screenwriter (along with John C. Higgins) of Byron Haskin's critically acclaimed Robinson Crusoe on Mars (1964).  He cowrote the screenplays for two U.S.–Danish coproductions, Reptilicus (1961) and Journey to the Seventh Planet (1962), and provided the English language script for Mario Bava's Planet of the Vampires (1965).

For television, he wrote the episode "The Premonition" for the second season of the original The Outer Limits series. The episode was broadcast in 1965.

Melchior's 1956 short story "The Racer" was adapted as Paul Bartel's cult film favorite, Death Race 2000 (1975), starring David Carradine and Sylvester Stallone and produced by Roger Corman. It was later remade as Death Race (2008), starring Jason Statham and Joan Allen, directed by Paul W. S. Anderson and produced by Tom Cruise.

He wrote the screenplay for the Pacific War action film Ambush Bay (1966) as well as writing and directing an anti-marijuana short subject Keep Off the Grass (1970).

He claimed to be the creator of the original idea upon which Irwin Allen based his television series Lost in Space, although he never received onscreen credit for this. In 1960, Melchior had created an outline for a series he called Space Family Robinson, which later became a Gold Key comic book.

Decades later, Prelude Pictures hired Melchior as a consultant on its Lost in Space feature film adaptation, but later sold his contract to New Line Cinema, its production partner on the film. New Line agreed to pay Melchior a $75,000 production bonus and $15,000, but refused him his contractually promised two percent of the producer's gross receipts from the film.

Sources

Interviews
 Lawrence Fultz Jr., "The Man From Angry Red Planet: Ib Melchior" Monster Bash Magazine, 2007, no. 6

 Brett Homenick, "THE IMAGINATION OF IB MELCHIOR! A Conversation with the Danish Monster Moviemaker!" Vantage Point Interviews, July, 2012. https://vantagepointinterviews.com/2017/05/18/the-imagination-of-ib-melchior-a-conversation-with-the-danish-monster-movie-maker/

Articles
 David C. Hayes, "Return To The Angry Red Planet" Planet X Magazine, October 2000 Vol. 1 No.4

References

External links
 
 

Ib Melchior on The Encyclopedia of Science Fiction
Trailers from Melchior's best-known films, with his own commentary

1917 births
2015 deaths
20th-century American novelists
American film directors
American film producers
American male novelists
United States Army personnel of World War II
Ritchie Boys
American male screenwriters
English-language film directors
Science fiction film directors
Danish emigrants to the United States
Writers from Copenhagen
American male short story writers
20th-century American short story writers
20th-century American male writers
United States Army officers